Austreim is a village in the municipality of Høyanger in Vestland county, Norway.

The village of Austreim was the site of a medieval stave church that was first mentioned in historical records in 1308. A memorial stone was erected in 1991 to mark the site of the historic church.

References

Villages in Vestland
Høyanger